Alan Ross (born 7 February 1933 in Ellesmere Port, Cheshire, England), is an English footballer who played as a goalkeeper in the Football League.

References

External links

1933 births
Living people
English footballers
People from Ellesmere Port
Association football goalkeepers
Bishop Auckland F.C. players
Oldham Athletic A.F.C. players
Accrington Stanley F.C. (1891) players
English Football League players
Sportspeople from Cheshire
Wigan Rovers F.C. players